Corey Circelli (born September 11, 2002) is a Canadian figure skater. He represented Canada at the Four Continents Championships and the Grand Prix series. He is the 2020 Canadian national junior champion.

Personal life 
Circelli was born in Manchester, England. He is of Italian descent.

Single skating career

Early years 
Circelli began learning to skate in 2007. He won the novice men's title at the 2017 Canadian Championships.

He made his ISU Junior Grand Prix (JGP) debut in September 2017, placing 14th in Riga, Latvia. Competing in the junior men's category, he won silver at the 2018 Canadian Championships and bronze at the 2019 Canadian Championships. At the time, he was coached by Lee Barkell.

2019–20 season 
Circelli changed coaches for the 2019–20 season, deciding to train under Brian Orser and Tracy Wilson. He placed tenth at his JGP assignment in September 2019 in Poland.

Circelli sustained a torn meniscus in his right knee in late December 2019. In January, he won the national junior men's title at the 2020 Canadian Championships, finishing 4.69 points ahead of silver medalist Wesley Chiu.

2020–21 season 
The 2020–21 season was significantly impacted by the COVID-19 pandemic, with rink closures and event cancellations. Circelli won bronze in the senior men's event at the Skate Canada Challenge. He qualified to the 2021 Canadian Championships, but the competition was eventually cancelled.

2021–22 season 
In August and September, Circelli competed on the 2021–22 ISU Junior Grand Prix series, placing fourth in France and Slovakia. In November, he made his senior international debut and placed tenth at the 2021 CS Cup of Austria. In January, he placed fifth in the senior men's event at the 2022 Canadian Championships. Later that month, he competed at the 2022 Four Continents Championships in Tallinn, Estonia, and finished eleventh.

2022–23 season 
Circelli's free skate is a tribute to Canadian champion Toller Cranston. Making his senior Grand Prix debut, Circelli placed tenth at the 2022 MK John Wilson Trophy in Sheffield, England.

Ice dancing career 
Competing in novice ice dancing with Katerina Kasatkin, Circelli placed 5th at the 2016 Canadian Championships and 4th at the 2017 Canadian Championships. Kasatkin/Circelli then moved up to the junior ranks and placed 13th at the 2018 Canadian Championships.

Circelli skated the next two seasons in partnership with Olivia McIsaac. Competing in juniors, McIsaac/Circelli placed eighth at the 2019 Canadian Championships and won bronze at the 2020 Canadian Championships. The two were coached by Andrew Hallam and Tracy Wilson.

Programs

Single skating

Ice dancing with McIsaac

Competitive highlights 
GP: Grand Prix; CS: Challenger Series; JGP: Junior Grand Prix

Single skating

Ice dancing with McIsaac

Ice dancing with Kasatkin

Ice dancing with Kim

References

External links 
 
 

2002 births
Canadian male single skaters
Canadian sportspeople of Italian descent
Living people
Sportspeople from Manchester